The Ásbirnings or Ásbirningar were a powerful family clan in the medieval Icelandic Commonwealth. They dominated Skagafjörður in the 12th and 13th centuries until their last leader died in the Battle of Haugsnes (Haugsnesbardagi) in 1246. The Ásbirnings were well-known warriors and politicians. The best known Ásbirning is probably Kolbeinn Tumason, a famous Icelandic poet. Other well known Ásbirningur were Kolbeinn ungi Arnórsson, nephew of Kolbeinn Tumason, and scholar Ingunn Arnórsdóttir.

References

 Árni Daníel Júlíusson, Jón Ólafur Ísberg, Helgi Skúli Kjartansson Íslenskur sögu atlas: 1. bindi: Frá öndverðu til 18. aldar Almenna bókafélagið, Reykjavík 1989

Icelandic family clans
12th century in Iceland
13th century in Iceland